The 1974 Virginia Slims Championships were the third season-ending WTA Tour Championships, the annual tennis tournament for the best female tennis players in singles on the 1974 Virginia Slims circuit. It was held from October 14–19, in Los Angeles, United States. The 16 best performers of the circuit qualified for the championship as well as the four best doubles teams. Third-seeded Evonne Goolagong won the singles title and the accompanying $32,000 first prize.

Champions

Singles
 Evonne Goolagong defeated  Chris Evert, 6–3, 6–4

Doubles
 Rosemary Casals /  Billie Jean King defeated  Françoise Dürr /  Betty Stöve, 6–1, 6–7(2–7), 7–5

References

External links
 

Tennis tournaments in the United States
WTA Tour Championships
Tennis in Los Angeles
Virginia Slims Championships
Virginia Slims Championships
Virginia Slims Championships
Virginia Slims Championships